This is a list of draft picks for the Oklahoma City Thunder franchise.
The franchise name was Seattle SuperSonics from 1967 to 2008 and has been Oklahoma City Thunder since 2008. As of the 2022 NBA draft, the last in which the Thunder had a selection, the team has selected 287 players.

Key

NBA Draft picks

References

 
National Basketball Association draft
draft history